Bezirk Baden is a district of the state of Lower Austria in Austria.

Municipalities
Towns (Städte) are indicated in boldface; market towns (Marktgemeinden) in italics; suburbs, hamlets and other subdivisions of a municipality are indicated in small characters.
 Alland
 Glashütten, Holzschlag, Rohrbach, Schwechatbach, Untermeierhof, Windhaag, Groisbach, Maria Raisenmarkt, Mayerling
 Altenmarkt an der Triesting
 Altenmarkt, Kleinmariazell, Nöstach, Sulzbach, Thenneberg
 Baden
 Bad Vöslau
 Bad Vöslau, Gainfarn, Großau
 Berndorf
 Berndorf-Stadt, St.Veit, Ödlitz, Veitsau/Steinhof
 Blumau-Neurißhof
 Blumau
 Ebreichsdorf
 Ebreichsdorf, Schranawand, Unterwaltersdorf, Weigelsdorf
 Enzesfeld-Lindabrunn
 Furth an der Triesting
 Aggsbach, Dürntal, Ebeltal, Eberbach, Furth, Guglhof, Hof, Maierhof, Niemtal, Rehgras, Steinwandgraben
 Günselsdorf
 Heiligenkreuz
 Füllenberg, Heiligenkreuz, Preinsfeld, Sattelbach, Siegenfeld
 Hernstein
 Aigen, Alkersdorf, Grillenberg, Hernstein, Kleinfeld, Neusiedl, Pöllau
 Hirtenberg
 Klausen-Leopoldsdorf
 Kottingbrunn
 Leobersdorf
 Mitterndorf an der Fischa
 Oberwaltersdorf
 Pfaffstätten
 Einöde, Pfaffstätten
 Pottendorf
 Landegg, Pottendorf, Siegersdorf, Wampersdorf
 Pottenstein
 Fahrafeld, Grabenweg, Pottenstein
 Reisenberg
 Schönau an der Triesting
 Dornau, Schönau an der Triesting, Siebenhaus
 Seibersdorf
 Deutsch-Brodersdorf, Seibersdorf
 Sooß
 Tattendorf
 Teesdorf
 Traiskirchen
 Möllersdorf, Oeynhausen, Traiskirchen, Tribuswinkel, Wienersdorf
 Trumau
 Weissenbach an der Triesting
 Gadenweith, Kienberg, Neuhaus, Schwarzensee, Weissenbach

References

 
Districts of Lower Austria